Paramenexenus inconspicuus is a species of phasmid or stick insect of the genus Paramenexenus. It is found in Sri Lanka.

References

Phasmatodea
Insects of Asia
Insects described in 1908